Bellefond may refer to the following places in France:

Bellefond, Côte-d'Or, a commune in the department of Côte-d'Or
Bellefond, Gironde, a commune in the department of Gironde